Riaan Etienne Esterhuizen (born 8 August 1994) is a South African professional rugby union player who most recently played with the . His regular position is centre, but is comfortable serving as a utility back.

Rugby career

Youth

Esterhuizen followed the traditional pathway by playing representative rugby at schoolboy level from the age of seven. He captained his high school team on both the 15-man format as well as the sevens format. After high school he joined and captained the  team for their Provincial Championship campaign in 2013. He moved to the Port Elizabeth-based  in 2014. He started six of the s' seven matches during the 2014 Under-21 Provincial Championship regular season, helping them finish top of the log to qualify for the semi-finals, winning all of their matches along the way. He started their semi-final against , scoring a try in the first quarter of the match to help them to a 28–26 victory. He also started the final against  in Welkom, playing the first hour of a 46–3 victory to secure the Group B championship. He remained in the starting lineup for their promotion play-off match against , where a 64–9 victory ensure Eastern Province would return to Group A of the competition in 2015.

Esterhuizen remained part of the team for their 2015 season, playing in five of their first six matches in a disappointing season for his side struggling to adapt to the new level, winning just one match all season and finishing bottom of the log.

He played for the team until 2019, captaining the NMU Madibaz from 2018.

Eastern Province Kings

After the 2016 Varsity Cup, Esterhuizen was one of several youngsters that were included in the  senior squad that competed in the 2016 Currie Cup qualification series.

Springbok Sevens 
Esterhuizen has had international success in the Sevens game. He was asked to join the Springbok Sevens Academy in 2014/15 and played two tournaments in Europe for the team before injuring his knee.

References

South African rugby union players
Living people
1994 births
People from Stellenbosch
Rugby union centres
Eastern Province Elephants players
Rugby union players from the Western Cape